The Grande Ronde Aquifer is part of the regional Columbia Basin basalt aquifer system in the northwest United States, and is one of three aquifer systems that make up the Water Resource Inventory Area (WRIA) 32, along with the Wanapum and Saddle Mountain aquifers. The aquifer is the main source of drinking water for the primary population centers of the Palouse; the university cities of Pullman, Washington, and Moscow, Idaho.

References

External links
Palouse Basin Aquifer Committee
City of Pullman – Water system
Pacific-Clearwater Environmental Institute – Moscow area aquifers

Aquifers in the United States
Bodies of water of Washington (state)